Samaila Suleiman (born February 3, 1981) is the Member of the House of Representatives of Nigeria. He is an All Progressive Congress (APC) member since 2015, representing Kaduna North Federal Constituency of Kaduna State. He dumps APC to PDP after an interest of Governor Nasir el-Rufai’s son, Bello, on his seat at the green chamber.

Early life and education
Born in Kaduna State, Nigeria, in 1981 from a Hausa political dynasty. Suleiman is a son of Alhaji Abdu Suleiman who was an elder statesmen and a prominent politician. His father was considered by many as a highly influential person that takes part in most political decisions in Kaduna State.

Suleiman attended Kaduna Capital School where he obtained his primary education in 1988-1993 and secondary school certificate in 1994-1999. He joined Abubakar Tafawa Balewa University, Bauchi, where he obtained a bachelor's degree in mechanical engineering in 2001-2004 and later Ahmadu Bello University, Zaria for a master's degree in International Affairs & Diplomacy in 2008-2009.

Civil career
Having successfully obtained his bachelor's degree in mechanical engineering in 2004, Suleiman moved to work with Kaduna Refinery between 2005-2006, and later did a transfer of service to Nigeria LNG between 2007-2008, Energy Commission of Nigeria in 2009-2010 and later resigned to join politics.

Political career
Suleiman was first elected into the public office as a local government chairman from Kaduna North in Kaduna State under the defunct Congress for Progressive Change (CPC) in 2008. He was the only politician to have won local government election under the CPC having shared the same constituency with the then vice president of Nigeria from the then ruling party People's Democratic Party (PDP).

In 2015, Suleiman was first elected into the Lower Chamber of the House of Representatives of Nigeria. He replaced the immediate past Deputy Minority Whip of the House of Representatives, Hon. Garba Mohammed Datti to become the 8th National Assembly's 2nd Chairman of the House Committee on Solid Minerals after his rejection of the chairmanship of the committee offered to him by the Speaker Yakubu Dogara's led administration.

References

Members of the House of Representatives (Nigeria)
Politicians from Kaduna State
Living people
1981 births
All Progressives Congress politicians
Nigerian Muslims
Abubakar Tafawa Balewa University alumni